Eik is a village in Lund municipality in Rogaland county, Norway. The small village lies in an area called Hovsherad on the north shore of the lake Hovsvatnet. The river Storåni runs through Eik.

Since 1981 it has had a station for worldwide Inmarsat access.  It is part of a communication system that is used by Denmark, and other countries.  The Eik treskofabrikk company is a clog factory also located in Eik.

References

Villages in Rogaland
Lund, Norway